Peace Bridge ( Most Pokoju) is located in Wrocław, Poland and was built from 1954 to 1959. It spans over 124 metres and was designed by professor Jan Kmita. At first it was known as Wojewódzki Bridge, but was renamed the "Peace Bridge" in 1966. Before World War II, there was another bridge in the same place, named after the German philosopher and poet Gotthold Ephraim Lessing ("Lessingbrücke"). It was made of iron, built in 1875, and lasted until 1945, when it was bombarded during the Siege of Breslau.

Currently, the bridge is used both for pedestrian and road traffic and is an important link between the Northern and Southern parts of Wrocław.

References

Bridges in Wrocław
Bridges completed in 1959
Road bridges in Poland